1st Foot Guards may refer to:

 Grenadier Guards, an infantry regiment of the British Army
 1st Foot Guards (German Empire), an infantry regiment of the Royal Prussian Army formed in 1806